Trying may refer to:
Trying (play), by Joanna Glass
"Trying" (song), by The Hilltoppers
Trying (TV series), a 2020 comedy on Apple TV+
"Trying" (Brooklyn Nine-Nine), an episode of Brooklyn Nine-Nine

See also
Attempt
Die Trying (disambiguation)
Effort (disambiguation)
Try (disambiguation)